Euconocephalus remotus is a species of insect in the family Tettigoniidae. It was described by Francis Walker in 1869 and is endemic to the Hawaiian Islands.

References

Conocephalinae
Endemic fauna of Hawaii
Insects of Hawaii
Insects described in 1869
Taxonomy articles created by Polbot